Peanut sauce, satay sauce (saté sauce), bumbu kacang, sambal kacang, or pecel  is an Indonesian sauce made from ground roasted or fried peanuts, widely used in Indonesian cuisine and many other dishes throughout the world.

Peanut sauce is used with meat and vegetables, adding flavor to grilled skewered meat, such as satays, poured over vegetables as salad dressing such as in gado-gado, or as a dipping sauce.

Ingredients 

The main ingredient is ground roasted peanuts, for which peanut butter can act as a substitute. Several different recipes for making peanut sauces exist, resulting in a variety of flavours, textures and consistency. A typical recipe usually contains ground roasted peanuts or peanut butter (smooth or crunchy), coconut milk, soy sauce, tamarind, galangal, garlic, and spices (such as coriander seed or cumin). Other possible ingredients are chili peppers, sugar, fried onion, and lemongrass. The texture and consistency (thin or thick) of a peanut sauce corresponds to the amount of water being mixed in it.

In Western countries, the readily and widely available peanut butter is often used as a substitute ingredient to make peanut sauce. To achieve authenticity, some recipes might insist on making roasted ground peanuts from scratch, using traditional stone mortar and pestle for grinding to achieve desired texture, graininess and earthy flavour of peanut sauce. This sauce is popularly applied on chicken skewers, beef satay or warm noodles.

Regional

Indonesia 

One of the main characteristics of Indonesian cuisine is the wide applications of bumbu kacang (peanut sauce) in many Indonesian signature dishes, such as satay, gado-gado, karedok, ketoprak, rujak and pecel, or Chinese-influenced dishes such as siomay. It is usually added to main ingredients (meat or vegetable) to add taste, used as dipping sauce such as sambal kacang (a mixture of ground chilli and fried peanuts) for otak-otak or ketan or as a dressing on vegetables. Satays are commonly served with peanut sauce. However, satay does not actually mean peanut sauce – Southeast Asia's favourite street food snack is a dish of skewered, grilled meat with infinite variations.

Introduced from Mexico by Portuguese and Spanish merchants in the 16th century, peanuts found a place within Indonesian cuisine as a popular sauce. Peanuts thrived in the tropical environment of Southeast Asia, and today, they can be found roasted and chopped finely, topping a variety of dishes and in marinades and dipping sauces.

Peanut sauce reached its sophistication in Indonesia, with the delicate balance of taste acquired from various ingredients according to each recipe of peanut sauce; fried peanuts, gula jawa (palm sugar), garlic, shallot, ginger, tamarind juice, lemon juice, lemongrass, salt, chilli, pepper, sweet soy sauce, ground together and mixed with water to acquire the right texture. The secret to good peanut sauce is "not too thick and not too watery." Indonesian peanut sauce tends to be less sweet than the Thai one (which is a hybrid adaptation). Gado-gado is eaten with peanut sauce throughout Indonesia showcasing the delicate balance of sweet, spicy and sour.

The Netherlands 

The Netherlands adopted peanut sauce as a common side dish through its former colonization of South East Asia. Besides being used in certain traditional Indonesian and Dutch-Indonesian dishes, it has found its way in to a purely Dutch context when it is eaten during, for instance, a (non Asian style) barbecue or with French fries. A popular combination at Dutch fast food outlets is French fries with mayonnaise and peanut sauce (often with raw chopped onions and with ketchup or Dutch currysauce), called a Patatje Oorlog (lit. "Fries War"). Peanut sauce is also eaten with baguette, bread, cucumber or potatoes. It is also used as an ingredient in the deep-fried snack food called Satékroket, a croquette made with a flour-thickened ragout based on Indonesian satay.

Other countries 

 In Chinese cooking, the sauce is often used on grilled meat. Other uses include hot pot and dan dan noodles.
 In Hong Kong, among the many dishes using this sauce is satay beef noodles, very common for breakfast in cha chaan tengs.
 In India, groundnut chutney (spicy peanut sauce) is served along with breakfast, such as idli and dosa. Variations include palli chutney (spiced whole peanut chutney) in Andhra Pradesh and kadalai chutney in Tamil Nadu.
 In the Philippines, peanut sauce is known as sarsa ng mani and is used as a dipping sauce for satay and for different varieties of lumpia.
 In Singapore, peanut sauce is not only used as dipping sauce for satay. It is also eaten with rice vermicelli known as satay bee hoon.
 In Vietnam, it is called tương đậu phộng and is used in cuốn diếp dish. The Vietnamese variation also contains hoisin sauce.

See also 

 List of peanut dishes
 List of sauces
 Peanut butter
 Peanut chutney
 Sambal
 Shacha sauce
 Siu haau sauce

References 

Sauces
Peanut dishes
Malaysian cuisine
Vietnamese cuisine
Philippine cuisine
Thai cuisine
Chinese condiments
Singaporean cuisine
Dutch fusion cuisine
Indonesian condiments